John Cranch may refer to:

 John Cranch (naturalist) (1758–1816), English naturalist and explorer
 John Cranch (American painter) (1807–1891), American painter
 John Cranch (English painter) (1751–1821), English painter

See also
John Cranch Walker Vivian